A subsun (also spelled sub-sun) is an optical phenomenon that appears as a glowing spot visible within clouds or mist when observed from above. The subsun appears directly below the actual Sun, and is caused by sunlight reflecting off of numerous tiny ice crystals suspended in the atmosphere. As such, the effect belongs to the family of halos. The region of ice crystals acts as a large mirror, creating a virtual image of the Sun appearing below the horizon, analogous to the Sun's reflection in a body of water. 

The ice crystals responsible for a subsun are typically in the shape of flat hexagonal plates. As they fall through the air, their aerodynamic properties cause them to orient themselves horizontally, i.e., with their hexagonal surfaces parallel to the Earth's surface. When they are disturbed by turbulence, however, the plates start to "wobble", causing their surfaces to deviate some degrees from the ideal horizontal orientation, and causing the reflection (i.e., the subsun) to become elongated vertically. When the deviation is sufficiently large, the subsun is stretched into a vertical column known as a lower sun pillar.

See also
 Crown flash
 Sun dog

External links
Atmospheric optics: subsun
EPOD: striking subsun

Atmospheric optical phenomena